Two justices of the seven-member North Carolina Supreme Court and four judges of the fifteen-member North Carolina Court of Appeals were elected by North Carolina voters on November 8, 2022, concurrently with other state elections. Terms for seats on each court are eight years. These elections were conducted on a partisan basis. 

Primary elections were originally set to be held on March 8, 2022, but were delayed by order of the state Supreme Court, and then rescheduled for May 17, 2022. Candidate filing began on December 6, 2021, but was suspended by the court's order. Filing later resumed, and ended on March 4, 2022.

Republicans won both seats on the Supreme Court and all four races for the Court of Appeals. As a result of these elections, Republicans would hold a 5–2 majority on the North Carolina Supreme Court.

Supreme Court Seat 3

This seat is currently held by Associate Justice Robin E. Hudson, a Democrat, who has held the seat since 2007. There was some speculation that Hudson would choose to not run for re-election, due to the fact that she was nearing the mandatory retirement age of 72. Hudson’s mandatory retirement would be February 29, 2024. If Hudson were to be re-elected to another term, she would only be able to serve a little over 13 months of her eight-year term.

On December 1, 2021, Hudson announced that she would not be seeking re-election. Court of Appeals Judge Lucy Inman ran for this seat.

Democratic primary
As only one Democrat filed to run for this seat, a primary was not held.

Nominee
Lucy Inman, Court of Appeals Judge (2015–present) and candidate for Supreme Court in 2020

Declined
Robin E. Hudson, Associate Justice (since 2007)

Republican primary
As only one Republican filed to run for this seat, a primary was not held.

Nominee
 Richard Dietz, Court of Appeals Judge (2014–present)

General election

Polling
Graphical summary

Results

Supreme Court Seat 5

This seat is currently held by Associate Justice Sam J. Ervin IV, a Democrat, who has held the seat since 2015. Ervin ran for re-election to a second term.

Democratic primary
As only one Democrat filed to run for this seat, a primary was not held.

Nominee
Sam J. Ervin IV, Associate Justice (2015–present)

Republican primary

Nominee
 Trey Allen, professor at UNC-Chapel Hill

Eliminated in primary
Victoria E. Prince
 April C. Wood, Court of Appeals Judge (2021–present)

Endorsements

Polling

Results

General election

Polling
Graphical summary

Results

Court of Appeals Seat 8 (Inman seat)

Lucy Inman, a Democrat, was elected to this seat in 2014. Inman ran for a seat on the Supreme Court in 2022 rather than seek reelection.

Democratic primary
As only one Democrat filed to run for this seat, a primary was not held.

Nominee
 Carolyn Jennings Thompson, former District Court and former Superior Court judge

Declined
 Lucy Inman, Court of Appeals Judge (2015–present) and candidate for Supreme Court in 2020

Republican primary
As only one Republican filed to run for this seat, a primary was not held.

Nominee
 Julee Tate Flood

General election

Results

Court of Appeals Seat 9 (Stroud seat)

Donna Stroud, a Republican, was first elected to the Court of Appeals in 2006 and subsequently re-elected. She was appointed to the position of Chief Judge by then-Chief Justice Cheri Beasley and assumed that role on January 1, 2021. Stroud ran for re-election.

Democratic primary
As only one Democrat filed to run for this seat, a primary was not held.

Nominee
 Brad A. Salmon, District Court Judge and former state representative (2015–2016)

Republican primary

Nominee
 Donna Stroud, Court of Appeals Judge (2007–present) (Chief Judge 2021–present)

Eliminated in primary
 Beth Freshwater Smith, District Court Judge

Polling

Endorsements

Results

General election

Results

Court of Appeals Seat 10 (Tyson seat)

John M. Tyson, a Republican, was elected to this seat in 2014 after previously serving on the court from 2001 to 2009. Tyson ran for re-election.

Democratic primary
As only one Democrat filed to run for this seat, a primary was not held.

Nominee
 Gale Murray Adams, Cumberland County Superior Court Judge

Republican primary
As only one Republican filed to run for this seat, a primary was not held.

Nominee
 John M. Tyson, Court of Appeals Judge (2001–2009; 2015–2021)

General election

Results

Court of Appeals Seat 11 (Jackson seat)

Darren Jackson, a Democrat, was appointed to this seat by Governor Roy Cooper in 2020, to fill the vacancy created by Phil Berger Jr.’s election to the Supreme Court. Jackson ran for election to a full term.

Democratic primary
As only one Democrat filed to run for this seat, a primary was not held.

Nominee
 Darren Jackson, Court of Appeals Judge (2021–present), former state representative (2009–2020), former minority leader of the North Carolina House of Representatives (2017–2020)

Republican primary

Nominee
 Michael J. Stading, Air Force JAG (Judge advocate) and former prosecutor

Eliminated in primary
 Charlton L. Allen, former member of the North Carolina Industrial Commission and former chair of Iredell County Republican Party

Results

General election

Results

Notes

Partisan clients

References

External links
Official campaign websites for Supreme Court candidates
Seat 3
Richard Dietz (R)
Lucy Inman (D)
Seat 5
Trey Allen (R)
Sam J. Ervin, IV (D)
April C. Wood (R)
Official campaign websites for Court of Appeals candidates
Seat 8
Julee Tate Flood (R)
Carolyn Thompson (D)
Seat 9
Beth Freshwater-Smith (R)
Brad Salmon (D)
Donna Stroud (R)
Seat 10
Gale Adams (D)
John Tyson (R)
Seat 11
Charlton Allen (R)
Darren Jackson (D)
Michael Stading (R)

judicial
2022